The Civil War Earthworks at Tallahatchie Crossing is a Civil War earthwork in Marshall County, Mississippi. The earthworks are located on federal land owned by the Army Corps of Engineers and consist of eight parapets used for Union cannons, as well as infantry trenches.

The earthwork was built along the north bank of the Little Tallahatchie River in late 1862 by Union forces to defend the Mississippi Central Railroad and their supplies in Holly Springs as they moved south towards Oxford and ultimately Vicksburg.

References

Archaeological sites on the National Register of Historic Places in Mississippi
Military installations established in 1862
National Register of Historic Places in Marshall County, Mississippi
Military facilities on the National Register of Historic Places in Mississippi
American Civil War on the National Register of Historic Places